Acosmeryx shervillii, the dull forest hawkmoth, is a moth of the family Sphingidae. The species was first described by Jean Baptiste Boisduval in 1875. It is found from the Indian subregion, Sri Lanka, to Sundaland, the Philippines and Sulawesi. Acosmeryx pseudonaga is sometimes treated as a valid species.

Description 
The colour varieties of the species have been described as separate species many times. However, they are classified as colour morphs of the single species A. shervillii.

According to The Fauna of British India, Including Ceylon and Burma: Moths Volume I by G. F. Hampson:

Biology 
There are three or more generations in Hong Kong, occurring from early March until early October. The larvae have been recorded on Saurauia, Dillenia, Leea, Cayratia, Cissus and Vitis species.

References

External links

Acosmeryx
Moths described in 1875
Moths of Asia